William Fabriel Myers (August 1850 – January 13, 1917) was a lawyer and state senator in South Carolina. An African American, he was involved in politics during the Reconstruction Era. He served as a state senator from 1874 until 1878.

Biography 

Myers was born 1850 in Charleston, South Carolina and was educated during the Reconstruction era at the University of South Carolina before being admitted to the bar in 1875.

He was appointed as an auditor for Colleton County, South Carolina in 1873 but was removed the following year by Governor Franklin J. Moses for political reasons.

He served as an elector in November 1876.

Myers was elected to serve in the South Carolina State Senate in 1874 and served until 1878.

He was also a major in the state militia from 1873 until 1877.

He served in 1910 as the deputy collector for the United States Customs in Columbia, South Carolina.

He died January 13, 1917 Columbia, South Carolina, and is buried in Randolph Cemetery with eight other reconstruction era legislators.

See also
 African-American officeholders during and following the Reconstruction era

References

1850 births
1917 deaths
South Carolina state senators
People from Charleston, South Carolina
People from Columbia, South Carolina
University of South Carolina alumni
African-American lawyers
1876 United States presidential electors